The New Town Hall has stood on the Domshof in the centre of Bremen, Germany since 1913. Located behind the Unser-Lieben-Frauen-Kirchhof cemetery, it is adjacent to the older section of the Town Hall with which it forms a harmonious ensemble. Among its sumptuous rooms decorated with local artefacts, the New Town Hall houses the Senate Chamber used by the Senate for its regular meetings and the Great Hall, a venue for official receptions. In 2004, Bremen Town Hall was listed as a UNESCO World Heritage Site, together with the Roland of Bremen, because of its outstanding architecture and testimony to the development of civic autonomy during the Holy Roman Empire.

History

Palatium, Stadthaus and planning of the new building 

Between 1819 and 1908, the building known as the Stadthaus supplemented the Town Hall in fulfilling the administrative requirements of the city. It had been built on the site of the Palatium, the archbishop's residence. The Stadthaus was a fairly simple building in the Neo-classical style. It consisted of offices and storage rooms for the municipal administration. In 1818, Bremen had 37,029 inhabitants but by 1904, the population had grown to 206,928. The rather modest building failed to meet the evolving requirements of the city. It lacked office space and was not sufficiently representative of the city's prosperity.

In 1891, Franz Schütte, the so-called "petroleum king" of Bremen, proposed replacing the Stadthaus with a more representative building. He presented plans prepared by cathedral architect Max Salzmann but as no funds were available, there was no follow-up. In 1899, Schütte bought a large plot of land from the senate for 2.5 million marks. He promised to develop the property on condition the city contributed its own resources towards building the new municipal administration. The proposals by Schütte and his consortium were initially turned down. But after heated debate in the parliamentary Bürgerschaft of Bremen, they were finally accepted with a majority of 89 in favour, 26 against and 1 abstention.

An open architectural competition for a new building as an extension to the existing Town Hall was launched in 1903/04. Despite the receipt of 105 proposals, none was selected. Another limited architectural competition in 1907/08 resulted in the selection of a proposal from the Munich architect Gabriel von Seidl. In 1909, the existing Stadthaus —– known as the "grey box" —- was pulled down, together with the remainder of the palatium dating from 1580. In 1908, the city police had moved into the new police station located on the Am Wall street.

The new building 

The new Town Hall, three times larger than the old building, was built from 1909 to 1913, mostly by local construction companies. The result was a fine three-storey Neo-Renaissance building with a clinker-brick façade and a hipped, copper-plated roof. The finish consisted of clinker bricks from Oldenburg and Muschelkalk limestone from Bavaria while Obernkirchen sandstone was used for the interior. Despite the practices of the times, it was decided there should be no tower.

Façades 
The main façade on the eastern side overlooking the cathedral consists of five two-sectioned windows with a narrow window band on either side. The hipped roof is structured with seven dormers. In the middle of the roof, there is a small ridge turret crowned by a Fortuna sculpted in gilt bronze and designed by Georg Roemer.

The southern façade overlooking the Grasmarkt and Marktplatz contains the two-storey oriel window of mayor's room. To the left, the three-storey glass façade with five bays contains a proclamation window which it was customary to include in old town halls but was more symbolic than practical.

The northern façade facing the Domshof is marked by the four-storey senate oriel with four bays. In accordance with Hanseatic practice, a Neoclassical triangular gable bears a globe in the form of an armillary sphere, designed by Georg Roemer. The symbols of craftmanship, trade, science and justice are displayed below the windows of the Senate Chamber. Reminiscent of Bremen's harbour, the maritime symbols and tools were sculpted by Heinrich Erlewein. The guardian angels on the third oriel ledge and the two upright city councillors were sculpted by Roemer.

The western façade opposite the cemetery is less ostentatious. It has five gables and a round tower with a spherical copper-plated spire. Inside, the Great Hall to the right encompasses two storeys while the Tapestry Room and the Fireplace Room are in the three-storey section on the left. Above the symmetrically designed Main Portal, the Bremen coat of arms bears the inscription S•P•Q•B for Senatus populusque Bremensis (Senate and People of Bremen), as well as the inscription ÆDIFIC A°D° MDCCCCX (built in 1910).

Inauguration 
The building was inaugurated on 16 January 1913 with speech delivered by Mayor Carl Barkhausen. From the beginning, the building was used as the Senate Chancellery, bearing the "Neues Rathaus" (New Town Hall). All were delighted when it was discovered that the actual construction cost 100,000 Marks less than the expected 1,518,000 Marks.

Decoration 
The façade decorations were designed by Gabriel von Seidl. Julius Seidler and Fidelis Enderle from Bavaria executed the work on the main and Grasmarkt façades while, on the insistence of the Senate, those on the other walls were created by the Bremen artist Heinrich Erlewein.

Gabriel von Seidl used biblical subjects for the five double windows on the cathedral side, from left to right: Adam and Eve's Fall from Grace, Susanna in the Bath, Abraham with Sarah and Hagar, David fighting Goliath, King Ahab with Jezebel and Naboth. The smaller windows on the left and right were decorated with subjects from the New Testament. The mayor's window on the left is decorated with mythological birds representing the qualities of Jesus Christ: the owl for wisdom, the eagle for strength, the pelican for love, and the phoenix for rebirth. The Evangelists' Window on the right carries the attributes of the four evangelists, the angel for Matthew, the lion for Mark, the bull for Luke, and the eagle for John.
 
The façades are also decorated with various figures and ornaments such as four children playing with domestic animals, the staff of Mercury, the trident of Neptune for trade and shipping, two playing angels on the Domshof architrave, squirrels nibbling at the national property, a lion killing a basilisk, several lions with rings in their mouths, one with the key from the Bremen coat of arms, several other animals, a siren tempting sailors and a man with a shield. 
The oriel of the mayor's room on the Grasmarkt side is decorated with four sculptures symbolising the cycle of the day: a young woman for the morning, a young man with a work tool for noon, an old man playing an instrument for the evening and an old woman, ready to retire for the night. To the left, there is a symbol for trade, a crocodile and a snail to symbolise the need to be wary when trading. Below the proclamation window, there are two stone medallions: Till Eulenspiegel and a lion.

Interior 

Pictures and paintings were provided by artists from Bremen including Carl Vinnen, Otto Bollhagen, Carl Windels, Fritz Jacobsen, Rudolf Alexander Schröder, and Bernhard Wiegandt as well as Ludwig von Herterich from Munich and Hermann Sandkuhl from Berlin.

Wood carvings were made by F. Schlaich and Zdzislaus Victor Kopytko. The sculptors Max Josef Rebhan and Hermann Lüdecke crafted the stuccoed ceilings and related work. Alfred Glaser from Munich created the children's frieze, some of the other ornaments in the entrance hall and a wooden sculpture of Abundantia, the goddess of (Bremen's) abundance. A number of tapestries were produced to the designs of Rudolf Alexander Schröder. A gargoyle on the west side was designed by Fritz Kallmeyer, Bremen.

Georg Roemer created a relief depicting Archbishop Giselbert while Johann Rode produced copper casts of two members of the council, the "Vergangenheit und Zukunft" (Past and Future) sculpture in the Great Hall, and a mirror in a gilt carved frame with figures. Anton Pruska, Munich, designed parts of the interior of the Great Hall and the Tapestry Room. Karl Selzer (Nürnberg) painted the clock dial, Fritz Behn (Munich) created the bronze "Schifffahrt" (Seafaring) sculpture in the entrance hall and the stuccoed coat of arms in the Great Hall. Fritz von Miller (Munich) designed a light fixture donated by the Bremer Wollkämmerei consisting of two whale jaws in the entrance hall. The golden coats of arms on the leather chairs were designed by Otto Hupp, Munich.

Distinctive rooms

Entrance Hall 
The Entrance Hall (Wandelhalle) on the ground floor displays an oil painting by Alexander Kirchner depicting the first east–west flight across the Atlantic Ocean in 1928 by the Junkers W 33 plane Bremen.

Grand Staircase 
The Grand Staircase (Festtreppe) with its appurtenances leads from the Entrance Hall up to the Upper Lobby.

Upper Lobby 
The richly decorated Upper Lobby (Obere Wandelhalle) leads to the mayor's rooms on the cathedral side of the building. The marble statue of Mayor Johann Smidt was sculpted by Carl Johann Steinhäuser. The bust of President Friedrich Ebert, sculpted by Georg Kolbe, is reminiscent of his activities in Bremen between 1891 and 1905. There are also busts of Theodor Heuss and Mayor Wilhelm Kaisen. A bronze statue titled Weser, produced by Fritz Behn, was donated by Norddeutscher Lloyd. An oil painting Die Klage Bremens (the Lamentation of Bremen) by Franz Radziwill depicts the destruction of Bremen in the Second World War.

Great Hall 
The Great Hall (Festsaal) is used for large receptions and presentations. From 17 March 1946 until 1966, it was home to the Bremische Bürgerschaft, the parliament of the State and City of Bremen. In the corners, there are paintings of the town gates and fortifications (Ansgaritor, Braut, Zwinger and Hohentor) by F. Jakobsen. A painting by Carl Vinnen depicts Bremen in the 17th century. Two coats-of-arms symbolise a historic partnership with the two Hanseatic cities Lübeck and Hamburg. In 1993/94, the light fixtures on the ceiling which had been lost in the war were reconstructed.

Tower Room  
The Tower Room next to the Great Hall (Turmzimmer am Festsaal) was used by Emperor Wilhelm II when he visited Bremen for the last time in March 1913 on his 22nd visit to the city. His relief portrait, donated by Herman Melchers (C. Melchers & Co.) and created by Adolf von Hildebrand (Munich) used to hang in the room.

Senate Chamber 
At the end of the Upper Lobby, the Senate Chamber (Senatssaal) is used for the sessions of the Senate of Bremen. The carpets were designed by the then young artist and writer Rudolf Alexander Schröder in his capacity as interior decorator. In 2012, Schröder's carpet was replaced by an exact replica,  in size. Produced in Nepal, the replacement cost €110,000.

Fireplace Room 
The Fireplace Room (Kaminsaal) is used for receptions. It takes its name from the tall French marble fireplace. A white stucco ceiling, dark red damask wallpaper, large 17th-century portraits and crystal chandeliers contribute to the character of the room.

Tapestry Room 
The Tapestry Room (Gobelinzimmer), once a mayor's office, owes its name to the two large French tapestries depicting the return of Artemis, daughter of Zeus, to Mount Olympus and the death of Otos.

Heritage listings 
Since 1973, the New Town Hall has been listed as a historic monument.

A number of listed buildings are located in the immediate vicinity:
 the Bismarck equestrian statue, sculpted by Adolf von Hildebrand (1910),
 the Neptune fountain by Waldemar Otto (1991), 
 the heralds by Rudolf Maison, re-established on the east side of the Town Hall in 2001 where they had stood between 1901 and 1941/42
 the bronze statue of the Town Musicians of Bremen by Gerhard Marks on the west side of the Town Hall (1953)

Literature 
 Adamietz, Horst (1970): Herz einer Stadt · Das Rathaus in Bremen. Hauschild, Bremen 
 Elmshäuser, Konrad (2002), Hans-Christoph Hoffmann, Hans-Joachim Manske (Hrsg.): Das Rathaus und der Roland auf dem Markt in Bremen. Edition Temmen, Bremen, pp. 68–77 
 Gramatzki, Rolf (1994): Das Rathaus in Bremen: Versuch zu einer Ikonologie. Hauschild, Bremen,  
 
 Tacke, Wilhelm (2013): Das neue Rathaus in Bremen oder wie kommt der Sündenfall über das Portal? Edition Temmen, Bremen,

References

External links 
Tourist information about Bremen Town Hall
Die virtuelle Rathausführung: Virtual guided tour with still photographs and video clips, in German

Buildings and structures in Bremen (city)
Renaissance architecture in Germany
Tourist attractions in Bremen (state)